ESDS may refer to:
 Economic and Social Data Service, in the United Kingdom
 Entry Sequenced Data Set

See also 
 ESD (disambiguation)